Chirpăr is a commune located in Sibiu County, Transylvania, Romania. It is composed of four villages: Chirpăr, Săsăuș (Sachsenhausen; Szászház), Vărd (Werd; Vérd) and Veseud (Zied; Vessződ). Chirpăr and Veseud villages have fortified churches.

Architecture
The village church was erected by the local Transylvanian Saxon community in the 12th century. It was initially built as a Romanesque basilica, made of stone.

History
The Mongol invasion of 1241–1242 caused great damage to the area. The first attestation of the locality (under the name of Kirchberg) dates from 1332.

In 1910 the Agnita to Sibiu railway line was completed with at station at Vărd; however the line was closed in 2001. An active restoration group has since been formed aiming to restore the entire line to working condition.

Natives
 Irina Petraș

References

Augustin Ioan, Hanna Derer. The Fortified Churches of the Transylvanian Saxons. Noi Media Print, 2004

 

Communes in Sibiu County
Localities in Transylvania